Alan Rockefeller is an American mycologist who specializes in fungi photography and DNA sequencing.

The autodidact (described by the San Francisco Chronicle as a "remarkably dedicated volunteer") collects and classifies "known and possibly new types of psilocybin and muscimol mushrooms." Mycology is an underfunded field that relies more than many scientific disciplines on independent naturalists and hobbyists for taxonomic extensions.

Rockefeller works professionally in information security but "the son of two science teachers…started studying mushrooms in 2001 and has since traveled around the world to find and classify them. Since 2007, he has made annual visits to Mexico and has photographed more than 1,000 fungi species that grow there." His explorations of Mexican cloud forests have included studies of night-fruiting, bioluminescent and fluorescent mushrooms.

Rockefeller was one of the taxonomists who first described Psilocybe allenii and he "recently co-authored a 2020 publication characterizing five Psilocybe species."

He also moderates Shroomery.org, a discussion forum for enthusiasts and home cultivators of psychedelic mushrooms, which remain illegal in many/most jurisdictions.

References

External links
 Alan Rockefeller on ResearchGate.net

Living people
American mycologists
Psychedelic drug researchers
Year of birth missing (living people)